Hisar Range (also known as Hissar, Hisor, or Gissar Range) is a mountain range in Central Asia, in the western part of the Pamir-Alay system, stretching over 200 km in the general east–west direction across the territory of Tajikistan and Uzbekistan.

Geography
The Hisar Range lies south of the Zarafshon Range, extending north of Dushanbe through Tajikistan's Hissar District of the Districts of Republican Subordination and reaching Uzbekistan at the north tip of Surxondaryo Region. Formerly known as Peak of the 22nd Congress of the Communist Party, the Khazret Sultan is also the highest point in all Uzbekistan. The Hissar Range is composed of crystalline rocks, schist, and sandstone, punctured by granite intrusions.

Nature 

See also
List of mountains in Tajikistan

References

Mountain ranges of Tajikistan
Mountain ranges of Uzbekistan
Surxondaryo Region
Districts of Republican Subordination
World Heritage Tentative List
Pamir Mountains